The Undying Flame is a lost 1917 silent film drama directed by Maurice Tourneur, produced by Jesse Lasky and released by Paramount Pictures. This movie starred Olga Petrova, an English-born actress who became popular in silents playing vamps.

Cast
Olga Petrova - The Princess / Grace Leslie (*as Madame Olga Petrova)
Edwin Mordant - The King
Herbert Evans - The Architect
Mahlon Hamilton - The Shepherd / Captain Paget
Warren Cook - General Leslie
Charles Martin - Colonel Harvey
Violet Reed - Mrs. Harvey

See also
The House That Shadows Built (1931 promotional film by Paramount with excerpt of this film)

References

External links
The Undying Flame at IMDb.com
The Undying Flame ; allmovie.com/synopsis

1917 films
American silent feature films
Films directed by Maurice Tourneur
Lost American films
Paramount Pictures films
1917 drama films
Silent American drama films
American black-and-white films
1917 lost films
Lost drama films
1910s American films
1910s English-language films
English-language drama films